Yako may refer to
Yako (name)
Yako (fox), a Japanese spirit possession of foxes
Yakō Station, a railway station in Yokohama, Kanagawa Prefecture, Japan
Yakö people of Nigeria
Yakö language of Yakö people
Yako Department in Burkina Faso
Yako, Burkina Faso, a town and capital of Yako Department
Yako Airport, a former airport near Yako, Burkina Faso

See also 
 Iaco River
 Yaako
 Yakko, a character from Animaniacs